This is a list of German television related events from 2002.

Events
22 February - Corinna May is selected to represent Germany at the 2002 Eurovision Song Contest with her song "I Can't Live Without Music". She is selected to be the forty-seventh German Eurovision entry during Countdown Grand Prix held at the Ostseehalle in Kiel.
9 November - The German version of Pop Idol debuts on RTL.

Debuts

Domestic
2 January - Die Affäre Semmeling (2002) (ZDF)
8 January - Um Himmels Willen (2002–present) (ARD)
9 January - Die Rosenheim-Cops (2002–present) (ZDF)
5 March - Berlin, Berlin (2002–2005) (ARD)
2 August - Unter Verdacht (2002–2019) (Arte)
9 November - Deutschland sucht den Superstar (2002–present) (RTL)

International
6 July - / Dragon Tales (1999–2005) (Sat 1)
17 August -  Family Guy (1999-2003, 2005–present) (ProSieben)

Military Television

Military Television Debuts

BFBS
5 April -  Merlin the Magical Puppy (2001–2002)
15 April -  Strange Dawn (2000)
16 April -  Ripley and Scuff (2002–2003)
20 May -  Shackleton (2002)
 Engie Benjy (2002–2004)
 Andy Pandy (1950-1970, 2002–2005)
/ Don't Eat the Neighbours (2001–2002)
 Sir Gadabout: The Worst Knight in the Land (2002–2003)
 Mr. Bean: The Animated Series (2002-2004, 2015–present)
 Rescue Me (2002)
/ Clifford the Big Red Dog (2000–2003)
 Fimbles (2002–2004)

Television shows

1950s
Tagesschau (1952–present)

1960s
 heute (1963–present)

1970s
 heute-journal (1978–present)
 Tagesthemen (1978–present)

1980s
Wetten, dass..? (1981-2014)
Lindenstraße (1985–present)

1990s
Gute Zeiten, schlechte Zeiten (1992–present)
Marienhof (1992–2011)
Unter uns (1994–present)
Verbotene Liebe (1995-2015)
Schloss Einstein (1998–present)
In aller Freundschaft (1998–present)
Wer wird Millionär? (1999–present)

2000s
Big Brother Germany (2000-2011, 2015–present)

Ending this year

Births

Deaths

See also 
2002 in Germany